Calochortus howellii, or Howell's mariposa lily, is a rare North American species of flowering plants in the lily family, found only in Josephine and Curry Counties in south-western Oregon.

Calochortus howellii is a bulb-forming perennial with straight stems up to 40 cm tall. Petals are white or pale yellow with purple hairs on the petals. It grows on serpentine outcrops at lower or middle elevations.

References

External links
Turner Photographics Wildflowers of the Pacific Northwest, Calochortus howellii

howellii
Flora of Oregon
Endemic flora of the United States
Plants described in 1888
Taxa named by Sereno Watson
Flora without expected TNC conservation status

Endemic flora of Oregon